Adelin is a village in Saint John Parish, Antigua and Barbuda.

Demographics 
Adelin has one enumeration district, ED 31500 Adelin.

References 

Saint John Parish, Antigua and Barbuda
Populated places in Antigua and Barbuda